Samsung Galaxy A02s is an Android smartphone designed and manufactured by Samsung Electronics as a part of its Galaxy A series. It was announced on 24 November 2020 alongside the Samsung Galaxy A12. Its notable features include an 6.5 inch HD+ PLS TFT display, Qualcomm Snapdragon 450 SoC, a triple rear camera setup and a 5000 mAh battery with 15W fast charging support including a Facial recognition biometric.

Specifications

Hardware
The Samsung Galaxy A02s is equipped with an 6.5 inch PLS TFT capacitive touchscreen with a resolution of 720 x 1600 (~270 ppi). The phone itself measures 164 x 75.9 x 9.1 mm (6.46 x 2.99 x 0.36 inches) and weighs 196 grams (6.91 oz). The A02s is constructed with a plastic front and a glass back and frame. It is powered by the Qualcomm SDM450 Snapdragon 450 (14 nm) SoC with an octa-core 1.8 GHz Cortex-A53 CPU and an Adreno 506 GPU. The phone can have either 16 GB, 32 GB or 64 GB of internal storage as well as 3 GB or 4 GB of RAM. Internal storage can be expanded via a microSD card up to 512 GB. The phone also includes a 3.5 mm headphone jack. It has a non-removable 5000 mAh lithium-ion battery. The Europe / India variant (A025G) also has an NFC module in it, which makes it possible to use Contactless payment services using the phone.

Camera
Galaxy A02s has 3 rear cameras, The main camera is a 13 MP wide lens and the second and the third are 2 MP depth sensors. The main camera can record video up to 1080p at 30fps. There is a 5 MP front selfie camera present in a notch.

 4 GB model cost 299$ 
 6 GB model cost 399$

Software
This unit shipped with Android 10 (One UI 2.5 themed) and can be upgraded to Android 11 (One UI 3.1 themed) and Android 12 (One 4.1 themed).

See also 
Samsung Galaxy A01
Samsung Galaxy A02
Samsung Galaxy A01 Core
Samsung Galaxy A series
One UI

References 

Samsung Galaxy
Mobile phones introduced in 2020
Android (operating system) devices
Samsung smartphones
Mobile phones with multiple rear cameras